Dutch Mills is an unincorporated community in Dutch Mills Township, Washington County, Arkansas, United States.

Since Dutch Mills is a small rural community, it receives mail delivery from Lincoln (ZIP code 72744). The population of the Lincoln ZCTA was 4,571 at the 2000 census. It is part of the Northwest Arkansas region.

History 
Dutch Mills was originally called Hermannsburg, named after its first documented settler, Johann H. Hermann, a German immigrant and former student at the University of Heidelberg.  In the early 1850s, Johann Hermann and his brother, Karl F. Hermann acquired the property of the town, built a mill, laid out the lots, and acquired the rights to a United States post office.  The brothers operated the mill, a small store, and both served as Postmaster (Johann in 1856 and Karl in 1859). Multiple German families moved there, following the Hermanns.
Hermannsburg was located at a dangerous crossroads between The North and The South during the American Civil War.  Bushwackers from both sides of the conflict regularly pillaged the town and conditions worsened after the Battle of Wilson's Creek.  Renegade Missouri Governor Claiborne Jackson and his Confederate militia commandeered the Hermann home in Hermannsburg for the night while on their flight to Texas.  Because many German immigrants sided with the Union cause, Southern bushwhackers would often target them for robbery and even murder.  In December 1862, the last 19 German immigrants who remained in the town, including the Hermann brothers and their families, fled Hermannsburg under the cover of night for the safety of the larger German community in St. Louis. After the Civil War, the name of Hermannsburg was changed to Dutch Mills.  The name change was likely intended as subtle insult, or perhaps a statement of indifference, by the English descended residents who didn't care to differentiate between the Germans and the Dutch.

Education 
Dutch Mills is located within the Lincoln Consolidated School District. Lincoln High School is its sole high school.

Notes 

Unincorporated communities in Washington County, Arkansas
Northwest Arkansas
Unincorporated communities in Arkansas
Populated places established in 1853